Cantá is a municipality located in the mideast of the state of Roraima in Brazil. Its population is 18,799 (2020) and its area is 7,665 km².

The municipality of Cantá was established in 1995. It is an agricultural community based on dairy production, livestock and bananas.

The municipality is known for its nature. Tourist attractions include the Serra Grande mountains, and the waterfalls of Véu de Noiva. Cantá can be reached from Boa Vista via the  highway.

The Malacacheta Indigenous Territory is located in the municipality. The  territory is home to Wapishana Amerindians.  The Tabalascada Indigenous Territory is shared by the Wapishana and the Macushi people, and measures .

References

External links
 Official website (in Portuguese)
 

Municipalities in Roraima